Ayça is a common feminine Turkish given name. "Ayça" derives from "Ay". In Turkish, "Ay" means "Moon" and "Ayça" means the "Crescent".

People
 Ayça Bingöl, a Turkish actor (see Turkish Wikipedia article)
 Ayça Dönmez, a Turkish singer who competed in Eurovision Song Contest 2002
 Ayça İnci, a Turkish actress appearing in The Crab Game (see Turkish Wikipedia article)
 Ayça Naz İhtiyaroğlu (born 1984), a Turkish volleyball player
 Ayça Şen, a Turkish author and rock music artist (see Turkish Wikipedia article)
 Ayça Tekindor, a Turkish singer (see Turkish Wikipedia article)
Ayça Ayşin Turan, a Turkish actress
Ayça Varlıer, a Turkish actress, singer, composer and TV presenter

Turkish feminine given names